Tajikistan participated in the 2010 Summer Youth Olympics in Singapore.

The Tajikistan team consisted of 6 athletes competing in 5 sports: archery, athletics, boxing, taekwondo and wrestling.

Medalists

Archery

Girls

Mixed Team

Athletics

Boys
Track and Road Events

Field Events

Boxing

Boys

Taekwondo

Wrestling

Freestyle

References

External links
Competitors List: Tajikistan

Nations at the 2010 Summer Youth Olympics
2010
Summer Youth Olympics